Peter Bruun (born 1968) is a Danish composer.  He is a native of Aarhus, and studied philosophy at Aarhus University before turning to composition.

He won the Nordic Council Music Prize in 2008 for his composition Miki Alone.

References

Danish composers
Male composers
1968 births
Living people
People from Aarhus
Ilk Records artists